Khairabad is a census town in Mau district, in the eastern part of Uttar Pradesh, India. It is located on the Mau-Azamgarh route, adjacent to Muhammadabad Gohna.Khairabad is known for

Demographics
At the 2011 census, Khairabad had a population of 12,056(males 51%, females 49%). Khairabad has an average literacy rate of 60%, higher than the national average of 59.5%. The male literacy rate was 65% and female literacy is 54%. 23% of the population was under 6 years of age. The main occupation is the production of sarees from silk, cotton, mercerized and other synthetic yarns which are sent to Varanasi, Bengaluru, Kolkata, Surat, Chennai, Ahmedabad, Bikaner and many other cities.

Educational institutions
Madrasah Manbaul Uloom
Heaven Garden School
Momin Ansar Girls Inter College
Ashrafia Ziaul Uloom 
Madinatul Uloom
Iqra Public School 
Amina Niyaz School
Sabera Public School
Mahadurrahma Littaleem Wattadreeb Ansar Nagar Mohammadabad
Madrasah Taalimul Quraan

See also
Habibur Rahman Khairabadi, Indian Islamic scholar from Khairabad in Mau

References

Cities and towns in Mau district